Canadian Independent Force was a non field or administrative corps grouping of specialized units of serving in World War I. It played an important role in the Battle of Amiens in the second half of 1918.

These units were:

 Canadian Forestry Corps
 Canadian Machine Gun Corps
 Corps of Guides (Canada)
 HQ Corps of Military Staff Clerks
 Royal Canadian Army Medical Corps
 Royal Canadian Army Pay Corps
 Royal Canadian Army Service Corps
 Royal Canadian Army Veterinary Corps
 Royal Canadian Corps of Signals
 Canadian Military Engineers
 Canadian Postal Corps

Not included were:

 Canadian Cavalry Brigade was not a member as it included a British Army regiment.
 Royal Regiment of Canadian Artillery - artillery units in World War I were assigned within the divisions in the Canadian Corps as well as Canadian Cavalry Brigade.

References

Corps of the Canadian Army